Choungui is a village in the commune of Kani-Kéli on Mayotte. It is located in south-western Mayotte, to the north of Mronabeja and to the east of Kanibe. The commune as of 2007 the community had a total population of 772  people. A football ground is located in the southern part of the village. One of the highest parts of the island, Mont Choungui, is nearby.

References

Populated places in Mayotte